Lepistö is a Finnish surname. Notable people with the surname include:

Laura Lepistö (born 1988), Finnish figure skater
Sami Lepistö (born 1984), Finnish ice hockey player
Hannu Lepistö (born 1946), Finnish ski jumping coach

Finnish-language surnames